Lyciasalamandra flavimembris, the Marmaris Lycian salamander or Marmaris salamander, is a species of salamander in the family Salamandridae. It is endemic to Turkey and is found along the southwestern Anatolian coast between Marmaris and Ula. It was first described as subspecies of Mertensiella luschani, now Lyciasalamandra luschani.

Description
The specific name flavimembris refers to the yellow limbs of this species. The body has dark brown ground colour above, with silvery white spotting; the tail is slightly lighter. The parotoid glands are yellow. There are also lightly coloured patches above the eyes. The venter is unpigmented, forming sharp contrast with the dorsal colouration.

Habitat and conservation
It is often found in maquis shrubland or pine woodlands. It is a rare species threatened by habitat loss from forest fires and by collection for scientific purposes. However, while IUCN (2009) concluded that "there is only limited habitat loss taking place", Göçmen and Kariş (2017) stated that the known populations "were under heavy habitat destruction".

References

flavimembris
Endemic fauna of Turkey
Amphibians of Turkey
Amphibians described in 1995
Taxonomy articles created by Polbot